Mary de Vere (circa 1554-circa 24 June 1624) was a 16th-century English noblewoman who lived a life of extraordinary wealth and privilege. The daughter of John de Vere, 16th Earl of Oxford, and his second wife Margery Golding, she married Peregrine Bertie, 13th Baron Willoughby de Eresby. The couple lived with their six children in Grimsthorpe Castle in Lincolnshire. Following Bertie's death, Lady Willoughby married Sir Eustace Hart. She died on about 24 June 1624.

Early life and family
No records exist for the date or place of birth of Mary, second child of John de Vere and his second wife, Margery Golding. She was born in late 1554 at the earliest, according to Professor Alan H. Nelson, her brother's biographer. He notes there's no mention of a pregnancy or sibling to Edward in the codicil to her father's will dated 28 Jan 1554. Mary's birthplace might thus be Hedingham Castle, Veer House in London, or one of her father's ten additional vast Essex estates. Mary's half-uncle was Arthur Golding, a translator of the classics and John Calvin. Shakespeare relied on Golding's translation of Ovid's Metamorphosis as a frequent source for his long poems and plays. Mary's brother Edward de Vere, 17th Earl of Oxford, married Anne Cecil, daughter of William Cecil, Lord Burghley, and the translator Mildred Cooke.

On 31 August 1562, Mary's father died. Twelve-year-old Edward de Vere became the 17th Earl of Oxford and was moved into William Cecil's household. Mary was probably seven or younger and thus likely remained with her mother, Margery Golding, who soon married Sir Charles Tyrrel. Golding died in 1568.

Marriages and issue
Mary was probably 21 when she accepted the proposal of Peregrine Bertie, 13th Baron Willoughby de Eresby. Two powerful women initially prevented the marriage: Queen Elizabeth and Bertie's mother, Katherine Brandon, Duchess of Suffolk. Their objection was Edward de Vere's abuse of his wife Anne Cecil. Oxford was in France when Anne became pregnant with their first child, and he initially responded with enthusiasm, sending Anne lavish presents. Then her father failed to stop an Oxford cousin from being executed, and de Vere set out to ruin Anne in retaliation. On his return in 1575, he publicly accused her of adultery, refused to live with her for five years, demanded she be banished from court, and declared their daughter a bastard. William Cecil eventually interceded, and Mary's marriage proceeded. Cracroft's Peerage gives their date of marriage as between December 1577 and 12 March 1578.

The Lincolnshire Archives contain evidence of Edward de Vere's dangerous, erratic behavior. Writing to Mary from Willoughby House, Peregrine Bertie describes how "uncurteously" he is "delte with" by her brother: "I heare [he has] bandeth against me and sweareth my death, which I feare nor force not, but lest his displeasure should withdraw your affection towardes me." The archive dates the draft 1580, but adds a question mark to the year because the archivists assume the letter was written before the couple married. If Oxford threatened the life of his brother-in-law in 1580, it'd be in keeping with his threats against Sir Phillip Sidney. Elizabeth kept Oxford under house arrest from 29 January to 11 February 1580, following his issue of a written challenge to Sidney. In December of that year, he "informed on three of his former dining companions, who in turn accused Oxford of murder, pederasty, necromancy, atheism, lying, drunkenness, and sedition." 1580 was also the year de Vere began an illicit affair with one of Elizabeth's maids of honor, who managed to conceal not just their sexual relationship, but her pregnancy. When Anne Vavasour gave birth on 21 March 1581, she was out of the palace by nightfall and imprisoned in the Tower the following day. Oxford attempted to flee the country, "but was captured and placed under arrest before 29 April." Between March 1582 and March 1583, street fights between Oxford's companions and an "incensed relative of Anne Vavasor" left four men injured, including de Vere, and four dead. The 13th Baron Willoughby de Eresby was not the only man whom Oxford treated "uncurteously." Edward de Vere was paid 1,000 pounds annually by the queen (a very significant amount at that time) probably for his literary contributions. He is considered the main contender to have written under the pen name of Will Shake-speare.

Mary de Vere's two oldest sons with Peregrine Bertie were prominent men of their time. Robert Bertie (1583-1642) was the 1st Earl of Lindsey; her second son Peregrine (d 1640) was made a Knight of the Bath by James I in 1610. Katherine Bertie, the couple's only daughter, married Sir Lewis Watson, first Lord Rockingham. Relegated by the Dictionary of National Biography to the category "other children" are sons Henry, Vere, and Roger.

Peregrine Bertie died on 25 June 1601. He was buried at Spilsby, Lincolnshire, in accordance with his 7 August 1599 will. Katherine, Lady Watson's grave is nearby. She died during her first childbirth in 1610. The statue memorializing her in St James's church is more haunting than typical effigies of the time.

Before 2 June 1605, Mary, Lady Willoughby became the first wife of Sir Eustace Hart of London. She died in London on about 24 June 1624.

References

16th-century English women
Mary
Mary
16th-century births
Year of birth missing
1624 deaths
17th-century English women
Daughters of British earls
Willoughby de Eresby